The Carnegie Public Library at 314 McLeod Street (S-298) in Big Timber, Montana, United States, is a Carnegie library which was built in 1913.  It has also been known as Big Timber Carnegie Library.  It was listed on the National Register of Historic Places in 2002.

It was designed by architects Link & Haire in Classical Revival style.

See also

 List of Carnegie libraries in Montana
 National Register of Historic Places listings in Sweet Grass County, Montana

References

External links

National Register of Historic Places in Sweet Grass County, Montana
Neoclassical architecture in Montana
Library buildings completed in 1913
1913 establishments in Montana
Libraries on the National Register of Historic Places in Montana